Marco is an unincorporated community in Stafford Township, Greene County, Indiana.

History
The first settlement was made at Marco in about 1816. A post office was established at Marco in 1853, and remained in operation until it was discontinued in 1967.

Geography

References

Unincorporated communities in Greene County, Indiana
Unincorporated communities in Indiana
Bloomington metropolitan area, Indiana